Meng'er Zhang (born April 22, 1987) is a Chinese actress best known for portraying Xu Xialing in the 2021 Marvel Cinematic Universe (MCU) film Shang-Chi and the Legend of the Ten Rings.

Early life 
Zhang is the daughter of an actor and a stage designer. She grew up heavily devoted to theatre arts in order to follow in her mother's footsteps. Prior to becoming a professional actress, she starred in stage and musical productions in Nanjing, where she was born and raised, and Shanghai. In 2009, she graduated from Nanjing University of the Arts with a bachelors degree. She attended the East 15 Acting School in Essex and the Russian Institute of Theatre Arts in Moscow.

Career

Early career 
In 2009, Zhang participated in China's Super Girl TV singing contest and was amongst the top 20 participants nationwide before withdrawing as her parents had arranged further schooling overseas for her. She later starred in numerous theatre productions. In 2013, in a Chinese stage adaptation, titled Finding Destiny (寻找初恋), of Korean musical, Finding Mr. Destiny, Zhang played the female lead Luo Yan. In 2017, she starred in the Chinese musical adaptation of The Street of Dawn (黎明之街) where she played Nakanishi Akiba (仲系 秋叶), and in Oliver Twist where she played Dodger. In 2019, she was in In The Mood For Sorrow (马不停蹄的忧伤) where she was nominated for the Best Leading Actress Award at 13th Daegu International Musical Festival.

Hollywood 
Shang-Chi and the Legend of the Ten Rings was her debut mainstream film role. Before being cast, she sent an audition tape for an unknown role in an unknown film for women who could speak both Mandarin Chinese and English. After being cast for Shang-Chi, she was trained intensely in martial arts stunt training. During production of Shang-Chi, she took advice from co-star Ben Kingsley on the distinction between stage acting and camera acting, and director Destin Daniel Cretton also coached her in on-screen acting as she had little experience working with camera framing. Her casting in the film was revealed at the Disney Investor Day 2020 in December of that year. Zhang joined the cast of The Witcher for its third season as a human huntress named Milva.

Personal life 
On May 10, 2021, Zhang married Yung Lee, an action designer on Shang-Chi, whom she met on the set of the film. The Shang-Chi cast and crew, including her costars Simu Liu and Awkwafina, hosted a surprise wedding reception for them at Disneyland.

Filmography

References

External links

 

1987 births
21st-century Chinese actresses
Actresses from Nanjing
Alumni of East 15 Acting School
Chinese expatriates in Russia
Chinese expatriates in the United Kingdom
Chinese expatriates in the United States
Chinese film actresses
Chinese stage actresses
Living people
Nanjing University of the Arts alumni
Russian Academy of Theatre Arts alumni